Dar Afshan or Darafshan may refer to:
 Dar Afshan, Falavarjan
 Darafshan, Pir Bakran, Falavarjan County